St Osyth Pit is a  geological Site of Special Scientific Interest north of St Osyth in Essex. It is a Geological Conservation Review site.

The site has a succession of deposits which throw light of the diversion of the River Thames south to its present course during the Anglian Ice Age around 450,000 years ago. The lower level has gravel deposited by the Thames when it flowed through the area before the ice age. This is overlain by sand and very fine gravel deposited by outwash during a brief period when the Thames was blocked by ice.

The site is private land with no public access.

References 

Sites of Special Scientific Interest in Essex
Geological Conservation Review sites
St Osyth